Prem Pariyar is Nepalese child singer who has performed in nepali movie series Nai Nabhannu La.He has released many Nepalese hit songs which were featured in Nepali movies such as Nai Nabhannu La.

He is popularly known as Kid with a great voice throughout Nepal after the success of his hit songs such as "Yi Aankhama Timi Chheu" and "Marne Kasailai" and has been featured on Nepal Television for an interview.

He started singing at an early age but he started to lose his voice while recording songs Nai Nabhannu La 3.

Musical career 
Prem started his musical while he was working in the hostel. After while with his singing skills he got accept to sing in nepali movie Nai Nabhannu La 2. Than he started to released more songs for other movies as well.

Discography

Movies

Singles 
	

All of his singles have been successful.

Albums

Awards

References 

21st-century Nepalese male singers
People from Dhading District
Child singers
Khas people